Jeffrey Jendryk II (born September 15, 1995) is an American professional volleyball player. He is a member of the US national team, a bronze medalist at the 2018 World Championship, 2019 World Cup, and the 2018 Nations League. At the professional club level, he plays for LUK Lublin.

He played and studied 4 years at Loyola University.

Honours

College
 National championships
 2015  NCAA national championship, with Loyola Ramblers

Clubs
 National championships
 2018/2019  German Championship, with Berlin Recycling Volleys
 2019/2020  German SuperCup, with Berlin Recycling Volleys
 2019/2020  German Cup, with Berlin Recycling Volleys
 2021/2022  German SuperCup, with Berlin Recycling Volleys
 2021/2022  German Championship, with Berlin Recycling Volleys

Youth national team
 2015  U21 Pan American Cup

Individual awards
 2015: NCAA national championship – All Tournament Team (Most Outstanding Player)
 2015: AVCA Second-Team All-American
 2016: AVCA Second-Team All-American
 2017: AVCA First-Team All-American
 2018: AVCA First-Team All-American
 2019: NORCECA Championship – Best Middle Blocker

References

External links

 Player profile at TeamUSA.org
 
 Player profile at PlusLiga.pl 
 Player profile at Volleybox.net
 Loyola Ramblers 2018 Roster – Jeffrey Jendryk

1995 births
Living people
Sportspeople from Evanston, Illinois
American men's volleyball players
American expatriate sportspeople in Germany
Expatriate volleyball players in Germany
American expatriate sportspeople in Poland
Expatriate volleyball players in Poland
Loyola Ramblers men's volleyball players
Resovia (volleyball) players
LKPS Lublin players
Middle blockers